Men's Slalom World Cup 1987/1988

Final point standings

In Men's Slalom World Cup 1987/88 all results count. Alberto Tomba was able to win six races out of eight.

External links
FIS-ski.com - World Cup standings - Slalom 1988

World Cup
FIS Alpine Ski World Cup slalom men's discipline titles